Coryell Judie (born October 14, 1987) is an American football cornerback for the Portland Thunder of the Arena Football League (AFL). After playing college football for Texas A&M, he was signed by the Denver Broncos as an undrafted free agent in 2012.

Professional career

Pre-draft
Judie was considered one of the top cornerbacks and a projected 6th round selection in the 2012 NFL Draft.

Denver Broncos
Judie signed with the Denver Broncos as an undrafted free agent following the 2012 NFL Draft. He was waived on July 25, 2012.

Portland Thunder
Judie was assigned to the Portland Thunder on October 9, 2013.

References

External links
NFL Combine profile
Texas A&M Aggies bio

1987 births
Living people
American football cornerbacks
Edmonton Elks players
People from Marlin, Texas
Players of American football from Texas
Texas A&M Aggies football players
Portland Thunder players
Fort Scott Greyhounds football players